The Varkaus railway station (abbrev. Var) is located in the town of Varkaus, Finland, in the province of Northern Savonia. The distance from the Helsinki Central railway station is 424.7 kilometres, via the Pieksämäki and Kouvola stations. All passenger trains from Pieksämäki to Joensuu stop at Varkaus, and the station also has cargo traffic.

The track from Huutokoski to Varkaus was built in 1914. It was then extended to Vihtari in 1939 and to Viinijärvi in 1940.

In addition to the Varkaus railway yard, the station contains links to the Kommila and Akonniemi trackyards.

References

Literature

External links 
 
 Station information

Railway stations in North Savo
Railway stations opened in 1914
Railway station